Lee Hei-Chun (이혜천, b. March 12, 1979) is a South Korean former left-handed relief pitcher.

References 
 Profile and stats on the KBO official website

1979 births
Living people
Doosan Bears players
NC Dinos players
Melbourne Aces players
South Korean expatriate baseball players in Japan
Tokyo Yakult Swallows players
Asian Games medalists in baseball
Sportspeople from Busan
Baseball players at the 2006 Asian Games
Asian Games bronze medalists for South Korea
Medalists at the 2006 Asian Games
Adelaide Bite players
South Korean expatriate baseball players in Australia